Joshua Aaron Williams (born 24 November 2002) is an English professional footballer who plays as a full back or winger for  club Birmingham City.

Life and career
Williams attended Our Lady and St Chad Catholic Academy in Wolverhampton. He joined Birmingham City's Academy in 2011 as an eight-year-old, and took up a two-year scholarship with the club in July 2019. According to the then academy manager Kristjaan Speakman, Williams "is a powerful and athletic player who is able to play in a range of positions. In central and wide positions he's able to run with and without the ball into dangerous spaces and in higher areas of the pitch regardless of his position, has demonstrated an eye for goal."

Williams played for Birmingham's U23 team as they beat Sheffield United U23 in the national final of that season's Professional Development League. Nominally at right back, he had so little defensive work to do in the first half that the Birmingham Mail ratings described him as "basically ... an auxiliary winger". He was one of five under-18s offered their first professional contract in 2021, and one of four who accepted. Ahead of the 2021–22 season he played in two first-team pre-season friendlies.

Williams made his senior debut as a substitute in Birmingham's 2021–22 FA Cup third-round match at home to League One club Plymouth Argyle, replacing Maxime Colin halfway through extra time when Birmingham were losing 1–0 and reduced to ten men. His next appearance was also his first senior start, in the first round of the 2022–23 EFL Cup away to Norwich City, which Birmingham lost on penalties. The Birmingham Mail marked him 8 out of 10 in a good overall debut. Four days later, Williams made his Football League debut, replacing the injured Marc Roberts after 55 minutes of the 1–0 defeat.

Career statistics

References

2002 births
Living people
Footballers from Wolverhampton
English footballers
Association football midfielders
Birmingham City F.C. players
English Football League players
Black British sportsmen